Devin Friedman is an American journalist.  He is a senior correspondent for GQ magazine.

Career
Throughout his career he has written for Rolling Stone, The New York Times Magazine, Esquire and The New Yorker, among other periodicals. He is currently literary executor of the estate of Clarence Beeks. Prior, he was the editor of the website Other People's Stories. He also oversaw the photography book This is Our War.

Early life and education
He grew up in Shaker Heights, Ohio. Friedman graduated from the University of Michigan in 1994.

Books
In 2006, Friedman authored his first book, This is Our War.

Awards and honors
Friedman was a finalist for the National Magazine Award and later won a Hopwood Award.

References 

Living people
Writers from Shaker Heights, Ohio
University of Michigan alumni
Journalists from Ohio
Year of birth missing (living people)